Cueva de Ágreda is a municipality located in the province of Soria, Castile and León, Spain. According to the 2004 census (INE), the municipality has a population of 95 inhabitants.

The nearest main town is Ólvega.

References

External links

Mis Pueblos - Cueva de Agreda

Municipalities in the Province of Soria